Antonio Dino Galvão (21 September 1901 – 11 September 1993), known as just Dino, was a Brazilian footballer. He played in seven matches for the Brazil national football team from 1921 to 1923. He was also part of Brazil's squad for the 1921 South American Championship.

References

External links
 
 

1901 births
1993 deaths
Brazilian footballers
Brazil international footballers
Footballers from Rio de Janeiro (city)
Association football midfielders
Americano Futebol Clube players
CR Flamengo footballers